Deborah Moggach  (née Hough; born 28 June 1948) is an English novelist and screenwriter. She has written nineteen novels, including The Ex-Wives, Tulip Fever (made into the film of the same name), These Foolish Things (made into the film The Best Exotic Marigold Hotel) and Heartbreak Hotel.

Early life and career
Moggach is one of four daughters of writers Charlotte Hough (née Woodyadd) and Richard Hough. Moggach was brought up in Bushey, Hertfordshire and St John's Wood in London, and was educated at Camden School for Girls and Queen's College, London.

She graduated from the University of Bristol in 1971 with a degree in English and trained as a teacher before going to work at Oxford University Press. She lived in Pakistan for two years in the mid-1970s and in the United States.

Novels and other writings
Most of her novels are contemporary, tackling family life, divorce, children and the confusions and disappointments of relationships. She has an ear for comedy but has also written a dark thriller set in America, The Stand-In; a bleak story of incest set near London Heathrow Airport, Porky; and a novel pitting Muslim versus English family values, Stolen.

Her two historical novels are Tulip Fever, set in Vermeer’s Amsterdam, and In The Dark, set in a boarding house during the First World War. Her  novel, Something To Hide (2015), is set in Texas, London, Beijing, and West Africa. The Indian subcontinent has featured frequently in her work.  Her other work includes a stage play and two collections of short stories.

She has adapted many of her novels as TV dramas and has also written acclaimed adaptations of other people's work, among them Nancy Mitford's Love in a Cold Climate, for instance, and The Diary of Anne Frank. Her script of the film Pride and Prejudice, starring Keira Knightley, was nominated for a BAFTA award, and Goggle-Eyes, from Anne Fine's novel, won a Writers Guild Award. These Foolish Things, her comic novel about elderly people moving to India to obtain affordable care, was made into the successful film The Best Exotic Marigold Hotel. Tulip Fever has also been made into a film.

Honours
In 2005 she was awarded an honorary doctorate by the University of Bristol; she is a Fellow of the Royal Society of Literature, a former Chair of the Society of Authors and was on the executive committee of PEN. She was appointed Officer of the Order of the British Empire (OBE) in the 2018 New Year Honours for services to literature.

Personal life
At Oxford University Press she met the man who became her first husband, Tony Moggach; the couple later divorced. He died in November 2015.

For ten years, her partner was the cartoonist Mel Calman.

After his death in 1994, she lived for seven years with Hungarian painter Csaba Pásztor.

She currently lives in the Welsh border town of Presteigne with her husband since 2014, Mark Williams, a journalist, editor and magazine publisher. They also have a maisonette in Kentish Town, north London.

She has two adult children: Tom, a teacher, and Lottie, a journalist and novelist. In 1985, her mother was sent to prison for helping a terminally ill friend kill herself. Moggach is a patron of Dignity in Dying and campaigns for a change in the law on assisted suicide.

Works

Novels
 You Must Be Sisters (1978)
 Close to Home (1979)
 A Quiet Drink (1980)
 Hot Water Man (1982)
 Porky (1983)
 To Have and to Hold (1986)
 Driving in the Dark (1988)
 Stolen (1990)
 The Stand-In (1991)
 The Ex-Wives  (1993)
 Seesaw (1996)
 Close Relations (1997)
 Tulip Fever (1999)
 Final Demand (2001)
 These Foolish Things (2004) (was adapted into the movie The Best Exotic Marigold Hotel)
 Also available as a "movie tie-in" book, with the same title as the movie.
 In the Dark  (2007)
 Heartbreak Hotel (2013)
 Something to Hide (2015)
 The Carer (2019)
 The Black Dress (2021)

Short story collections
 Smile and Other Stories (1987)
 Changing Babies and Other Stories (1995)

Screenplays
 Pride & Prejudice (2005)
 Tulip Fever (2017)

Teleplays
 To Have and to Hold (mini-series) (1986)
 Goggle Eyes (adaptation of an Anne Fine novel) (1993) (Won a Writers' Guild Award for Best Adapted TV Serial)
 Seesaw (adaptation of her own novel) (1998)
 Close Relations (adaptation of her own novel) (1999)
 Love in a Cold Climate (adaptation of two Nancy Mitford novels) (2001)
 Final Demand (adaptation of her own novel) (2003)
 The Diary of Anne Frank (2009)
 Stolen (adapted from her own novel) (1991)

Stage play
 Double-Take

References

External links
 
 Author's website
 From Hampstead to Hollywood
 University of Bristol announcement about Moggach's receipt of honorary degree

1948 births
Living people
Alumni of the University of Bristol
English screenwriters
Fellows of the Royal Society of Literature
British women screenwriters
People educated at Camden School for Girls
People educated at Queen's College, London
English expatriates in Pakistan
20th-century English novelists
21st-century British novelists
20th-century English women writers
21st-century English women writers
English women novelists
People from Middlesex
People from Bushey
People from Hampstead
People from Powys
People from St John's Wood
21st-century British screenwriters